Anchoa mitchilli is a species of ray-finned fish in the family Engraulidae, the anchovies. Its common names include bay anchovy and common anchovy. It is native to the western Atlantic Ocean and Gulf of Mexico. It is one of the most common fish species along the coastlines of the western Atlantic.

Etymology
The fish is named in honor of Samuel Latham Mitchill (1764–1831), naturalist, physician and U.S. Senator, who studied the fishes of New York.

Description
The bay anchovy is somewhat variable in appearance. It is a small, slender, schooling fish with a greenish body and a silvery stripe. It is characterized by its very long jaw, silvery belly, lateral stripe, and single dorsal fin. The dorsal fin is located directly above the anal fin origin. The adult male is generally about 6 centimeters long, with a maximum length of 10 to 11 centimeters. It has 14 to 16 rays in its dorsal fin, 24 to 30 in its anal fin, and 11 to 12 in the pectoral. It may live more than three years.

The bay anchovy is similar to other species in the genus Anchoa which occur in the same regions. The broad-striped anchovy is similar in appearance but grows to a larger size, up to 15 centimeters. The Cuban anchovy has its anal fin set farther back on the body.

Range and habitat
This species is distributed in the Atlantic Ocean and Gulf of Mexico along the eastern coasts of North America from Maine to Yucatán. It does not occur in the West Indies. It is well known in the Chesapeake Bay, where it is the most abundant fish.

It occurs in a wide range of water temperatures and salinities, including some hypersaline environments. It does not tolerate low-oxygen waters and easily asphyxiates when deprived of oxygen.

This fish spends most of its time cruising the water column. It can also be found over bare substrates at the ocean floor and in tide pools and surf zones. It can live in muddy, brackish waters. It rarely enters waters deeper than 25 meters.

Biology and ecology
This fish feeds on zooplankton, including copepods, mysids, and crab larvae.

It is in turn an important prey item for a variety of larger fish, including weakfish (Cynoscion regalis), striped bass (Morone saxatilis), chain pickerel (Esox niger), and bluefish (Pomatomus saltatrix). Birds such as royal terns (Thalasseus maximus) and Sandwich terns (T. sandvicensis) feed on it.

This species is an important link in the food web in many ecosystems. It is a major pathway by which zooplankton biomass is converted to the biomass of larger fish.

The bay anchovy is sexually mature when it reaches about 4 centimeters in length. It spawns in the water column in shallow and deeper waters. In the southern part of its range it spawns year-round, and farther north it breeds during the warmer months. A female can spawn 50 times in one season, producing over 1000 eggs each time. Eggs hatch in 24 hours. Larvae mature in about 45 days. Their growth rates are variable and may depend on the availability of food.

Human uses
This species is made into anchovy paste and is used as a bait fish. It is harvested as a rough fish and used for fish oil and fish paste.

Conservation
This fish is not of conservation concern. It has an extensive range, a large and stable population made up of many subpopulations, and no major threats.

References

Further reading
Jung, S. and E. D. Houde. 2004. Recruitment and spawning-stock biomass distribution of bay anchovy (Anchoa mitchilli) in Chesapeake Bay. Fishery Bulletin 102(1) 63-77.
North, E. W. and E. D. Houde. 2004. Distribution and transport of bay anchovy (Anchoa mitchilli) eggs and larvae in Chesapeake Bay. Estuarine, Coastal and Shelf Science 60(3), 409-29.
Peebles, E. B., J. R. Hall, and S. B. Tolley. 1996. [https://www.int-res.com/articles/meps/131/m131p061.pdf Egg production by the bay anchovy Anchoa mitchilli in relation to adult and larval prey fields.] Marine Ecology Progress Series 134 61-73.
Scharf, F. S., J. A. Buckel, and F. Juanes. 2002. Size-dependent vulnerability of juvenile bay anchovy Anchoa mitchilli to bluefish predation: Does large body size always provide a refuge? Marine Ecology Progress Series 233 241-52.
Schultz, E. T., et al. 2000. Explaining advection: do larval bay anchovy (Anchoa mitchilli) show selective tidal-stream transport? ICES Journal of Marine Science: Journal du Conseil'' 57(2), 360-71.

mitchilli
Fish described in 1848
Taxa named by Achille Valenciennes